Narayanan Srinivasan (1930–2014) was an Indian nuclear scientist and the founder project director of Indira Gandhi Centre for Atomic Research (IGCAR). One of the pioneers of atomic energy program in India, he served as the design engineer for the plutonium plant at Trombay, as the project director of IGCAR (the then Reactor Research Centre) at Kalpakkam, as the chief executive of Heavy Water Board and later the Nuclear Fuel Complex, and sat in the Atomic Energy Commission of India from 1982 to 1987. The Government of India awarded him the Padma Bhushan, the third highest civilian award, in 2003. He was also a recipient of the Lifetime Achievement Award of the Department of Atomic Energy which he received in 2009. Srinivasan died on May 18, 2014, at Chennai, at the age of 84.

References

Further reading

External links
 
 

Recipients of the Padma Bhushan in science & engineering
Indian nuclear physicists
1930 births
2014 deaths
People from Tamil Nadu
Atomic Energy Commission of India